"Twinkle, Twinkle, Little Bat" is a poem recited by the Mad Hatter in chapter seven of Lewis Carroll's 1865 novel Alice's Adventures in Wonderland. It is a parody of "Twinkle Twinkle Little Star".

Text

Context
The Hatter is interrupted in his recitation by the Dormouse. "The Bat" was the nickname of Professor Bartholomew Price, one of the Dons at Oxford, a former teacher of Carroll's and well known to Alice Liddell's family.

Other appearances
 In Robert W. Chambers's children's book, Orchard-land (1903), the poem is partially quoted, in the seventh chapter titled ‘Tha Bat’ and the creature reveals his dislike of being associated with a flying tea tray.
 The poem was sung in Disney's 1951 Alice in Wonderland film. In it, the Dormouse drowsily recited it at the tea party. The poem was later sung again at Alice's trial, and taken down as "important" evidence.
 It was sung on an episode of the 1970s children's television series Zoom and in the 1990s remake.
 On the 1974 Steeleye Span album 'Now We Are Six', track 9 'Twinkle Twinkle Little Star' has someone singing 'Twinkle Twinkle Little Bat' quietly in the left audio track, and being very amused by themselves.
 In  the 1960s Batman series, Batman and a woman sing it while trapped in vases with pebbles being dropped on them in a version of the "Chinese water torture".
 The line "Like a teatray in the sky" is used in a 1968 song by The Move entitled "Cherry Blossom Clinic", about a mental patient.
 This song is in the 1972 film Alice's Adventures in Wonderland sung by Robert Helpmann.
 The poem was sung in the 1999 film by the Hatter (Martin Short) as a sort of "encore" to his singing performances.
 In the Muppet Show version of Alice in Wonderland, the Mad Tea Party scene opens with The Hatter (Gonzo the Great) and the March hare and Dormouse (Camilla the chicken) singing the poem, only to fall about laughing immediately afterwards.
 The first two lines of the poems were recited by the Mad Hatter in the episode "Mad as a Hatter" of Batman: The Animated Series.
 The poem is also used in the Batman: Legends of the Dark Knight Halloween special entitled "Madness". It is read aloud by the Mad Hatter, one of the villains in the series. It can be found in the Haunted Knight Collection written by Jeph Loeb and illustrated by Tim Sale. 
 In the 1995 film Batman Forever, the character Riddler tells Batman, "twinkle twinkle little bat / how I wonder where you're at." 
 In Tim Burton's 2010 film version of Alice in Wonderland, the Mad Hatter leads the March Hare and Dormouse in a recitation of this poem in an attempt to distract Stayne from discovering Alice.
 In the 2011 video game Batman: Arkham City, The Joker recites his own version of the poem that goes "twinkle, twinkle, little bat / watch me kill your favorite cat", in regards to his attempted murder of Catwoman with a sniper rifle.
 Mad March recites the first two lines in the 2009 Syfy TV miniseries, Alice, while interrogating Hatter.
 It was also referenced in the manga Devil May Cry 3: Code 1 "Dante" on page 76 by a demon reminiscent of the Mad Hatter.
 2 lines were also quoted in Agatha Christie's 'The Erymanthian Boar' from The Labours of Hercules (1947) when Hercule Poirot remembers the lines: "Up above the world so high, like a tea tray in the sky." as he is unhappy with having to stay in a hotel that is high up in the mountains.
 In Part Two of the 2021 film, Batman: The Long Halloween (film) the first two lines are recited by The Mad Hatter before he is interrupted.
 The version quoted in Cat's Cradle by Kurt Vonnegut uses the line "Like a tea tray in the night".

References

Alice's Adventures in Wonderland
Poetry by Lewis Carroll
1865 poems
Musical parodies
Bats in popular culture